Omagh St Enda's is a Gaelic Athletic Association club from Omagh, County Tyrone, Northern Ireland.

Conor Sally is club chairman.

History
GAA clubs existed in Drumragh parish during 1904-09 (including hurling and camogie), 1917–20 and intermittently in the 1920s. However it wasn't until 1932 when the Omagh St Enda's club was founded. The club's first meeting took place on 28 February in St Patrick's Hall opposite the Sacred Heart Church. Omagh contested the Tyrone Senior Football Championship final on four occasions  before eventually winning the cup for the first time in 1948, beating Clogher Éire Óg GAC 1–3 to 0–2.

In early 1962, the Omagh St Enda's club purchased  of land at Lisnelly located near the Gortin Road. By 1968 the club had raised enough money to start construction of the new stadium. The park was eventually opened on 17 September 1972 and was named Healy Park after Micheal Healy.

Since the club's inception, it has claimed 8 Tyrone Senior Football Championships, 3 Tyrone Senior Hurling Championships and Ulster Minor and U21 Championships. The club also has 7 All-Ireland titles in Scór.

In 2005, Joe McMahon became the first Omagh man to lift the Sam Maguire Cup. In 2008, brothers Joe and Justin McMahon were part of the victorious All-Ireland Senior Football Championship team, with Joe McMahon claiming his second All-Ireland medal. Justin McMahon went on to win an All-Star for the full-back position in the same year, the first St Enda's club man to achieve the award.

Notable players
 Joe McMahon
 Justin McMahon
 Conor Meyler
 Ronan O'Neill

Recent successes
St Enda's won the 2014 Tyrone Senior Football Championship against Carrickmore St Colmcille's on a scoreline of 1–10 to 0–12. A last-minute goal from Ronan O'Neill sealed victory and bridged a 26-year gap since the club's last senior championship triumph in 1988.

St Enda's have also had great success at youth level over the last number of years. The highlights being the 2009 Ulster Minor Club Football Championship and the 2011 Ulster U21 Club Football Championship victorys. Since 2007, St Enda's have claimed 3 Juvenile Leagues (2007, 2008, 2009), 3 Juvenile Championships (2007, 2008, 2009), 3 Minor Leagues (2008, 2009, 2010), 2 Minor Championships (2009, 2010) and 3 U21 Championships (2009, 2011, 2014).

In ladies football, St Enda's won the Tyrone Junior Championship and Ulster Championships in 2010. The ladies went on to win the Tyrone Intermediate Championship in 2011 and more recently in 2014.

Roll of honour

Men's Football
 Tyrone Senior Football Championship (8)
 1948, 1952, 1953, 1954, 1957, 1963, 1988, 2014, 2017
 Tyrone Senior Football League (3)
 1980, 1988, 1990
 Tyrone Intermediate Football Championship (1)
 1977
 Ulster Under-21 Club Football Championship (1)
 2011
 Tyrone U-21 Football Championship (3)
 2009, 2011, 2014
 Ulster Minor Club Football Championship (1)
 2009
 Tyrone Minor Football Championship (9)
 1946, 1947, 1949, 1965, 1970, 1971, 1983, 2009, 2010
 Tyrone Under-16 Football Championship 
 2015
 Tyrone Under-16 Football League
 2015

Hurling
 Tyrone Senior Hurling Championship (3 times):
 1967, 1971, 1973

References

External links
Official Site

Gaelic games clubs in County Tyrone
Gaelic football clubs in County Tyrone
Hurling clubs in County Tyrone
Omagh